Countess Maria Louise Albertine of Leiningen-Dagsburg-Falkenburg (16 March 1729 – 11 March 1818); also known as Princess George, was heiress to the barony of Broich and by marriage Princess of Hesse-Darmstadt. She was the grandmother and educator of Princess Louise of Mecklenburg-Strelitz, who later became Queen consort of Prussia.

Life 
Countess Maria Louise Albertine was a daughter of Count Christian Karl Reinhard of Leiningen-Dagsburg-Falkenburg (1695–1766) and his wife Countess Katharina Polyxena of Solms-Rödelheim und Assenheim (1702–1765). After the death of her father, she was heiress to the barony of Broich and began with the architect Nicolas de Pigage, the restoration and expansion of the Castle Broich. In 1806, the government of Broich was dissolved by Napoleon and in 1815 Broich was annexed by Prussia.

On 16 March 1748, she married Prince George William of Hesse-Darmstadt, the brother of the reigning Landgrave Louis IX of Hesse-Darmstadt in Heidesheim am Rhein. As Louis IX stayed almost exclusively in Pirmasens, she felt obliged, after the death of his wife in 1774, to represent the territory in the capital Darmstadt.

Her daughters Friederike and Charlotte were the first and second wives of Duke Charles II of Mecklenburg-Strelitz. They both died in childbirth. Charles then ended his service as governor-general in Hannover and moved with his children to his wives' mother in Darmstadt. Princess George was a widow since 1782 and took over the education and care of Charles's children.

Charlotte did not move with her father to Darmstadt.  At the age of 16, she had been married to the Duke of Saxe-Hildburghausen. His father visited his two sons frequently and moved to Hildburghausen with his oldest daughter in 1787, after he became president of the local imperial debit commission. Thus, Maria Luise cared primarily for Louise and her sisters Therese and Friederike for whom she provided a secure and largely informal home in the "Old Palace" at the market square in Darmstadt. She employed regional educational methods.

In 1790 she traveled with Louise, Frederica and George to Frankfurt to see the coronation of Emperor Leopold II. She stayed here with Catharina Elisabeth Goethe. In 1791, she joined an educational trip to the Netherlands. In 1792 she fled from the advancing French army and took the children from Darmstadt to her granddaughter Charlotte in Hildburghausen, where she remained until March 1793. On the return trip to Darmstadt, she traveled via Frankfurt, where a meeting between Louise and her future husband Frederick William III of Prussia had been arranged. In 1793 she accompanied Louise and Frederica to their wedding in Berlin.

Maria Louise was described as a magnificent person, warm hearted, cheerful all the time and usually speaking the Palatinate dialect.  The proximity and warmth she has as a surrogate mother during the formative years of her granddaughters passed on to them. She had 15 great great grandchildren when she died.

Issue

Ancestry

References

External links 
 http://www.guide2womenleaders.com/womeninpower/Womeninpower1740.htm

Leiningen family
German countesses
Lords of Broich
1729 births
1818 deaths